The Convair YB-60 was a prototype heavy bomber built by Convair for the United States Air Force in the early 1950s. It was a purely jet-powered development of Convair's earlier mixed-power B-36 Peacemaker.

Design and development

On 25 August 1950, Convair issued a formal proposal for a swept-winged version of the B-36 with all-jet propulsion. The Air Force was sufficiently interested that on 15 March 1951, it authorized Convair to convert two B-36Fs (49-2676 and 49-2684) as the B-36G. Since the aircraft was so radically different from the existing B-36, the designation was soon changed to YB-60.

The YB-60 had 72% parts commonality with its piston-engined predecessor. The fuselages of the two aircraft were largely identical although the radar and bombing systems were located in a removable nose section as a result of the poor reliability of the B-36 installation. For initial flight testing a more streamlined nose with an instrumented boom was fitted; a wedge-shaped insert was added just outboard of the main landing gear to increase wing sweep and the tail surfaces were swept to match. The swept wings also used many B-36 parts. A steerable tail wheel was added to prevent the aircraft tipping backwards. It was not necessarily extended when on the ground but depended on how the aircraft was loaded.

The YB-60's unofficial competitor for an Air Force contract was Boeing's B-52 Stratofortress. Convair's proposal was substantially cheaper than Boeing's, since it involved modifying an existing design rather than starting from scratch. Like the B-52, it was powered by eight Pratt & Whitney J57-P-3 turbojets mounted in pairs in four pods suspended below the wing. Prior to this engine configuration Convair had evaluated a six-turboprop design and one with 12 J47 engines.

The first YB-60 prototype's crew numbered five; the second prototype's numbered nine, as it did in the planned production B-60s. Production B-60s were to have defensive armament similar to those of the B-36.

Convair YB-60 serial number 49-2676 made its maiden flight on 18 April 1952, piloted by Beryl Erickson. The Boeing YB-52 beat the Convair aircraft into the air by three days. The YB-60 was approximately  slower than the YB-52 and also had significant handling problems, due to its controls having been designed for slower operating speeds. It did carry a heavier bomb load —  against  for the YB-52 — but the Air Force did not see the need for the extra capacity, given the YB-60's other drawbacks. The flight test programs were canceled on 20 January 1953, with 66 flying hours accumulated. The second prototype was nearing completion but its engines had not been installed and other equipment installations had not been completed. Since Convair completed their prototype contract satisfactorily, both YB-60s were formally accepted by the Air Force in 1954. The operational aircraft never flew again, and both airframes were scrapped by July.

The program cost was $14.3 million.

An airliner adaptation of the YB-60 was proposed by Convair, but its wingspan and weight would have required unacceptable airport infrastructure changes beyond those required for the upcoming Boeing 707. The company decided to pursue the Convair 880 series airliner instead.

Specifications (YB-60)

See also

References

 Jacobsen, Meyers K. and Wagner, Ray. B-36 in Action (Aircraft in Action No.42). Carrollton, TX: Squadron/Signal Publications, Inc., 1980. .
 Jenkins, Dennis R. Magnesium Overcast, The Story of the Convair B-36. Specialty Press, 2001. .
 Jones, L.S. U.S. Bombers, B-1 1928 to B-1 1980s. Fallbrook, CA: Aero Publishers, Inc., 1962 (second edition 1974). .
 Knaack, Marcelle Size. Post-World War II bombers, 1945-1973 Office of Air Force History, 1988.

External links

 Convair YB-60
 "Heavies of the U.S. and Russian air forces", Popular Mechanics, June 1952, p. 93.

B-60, Convair
B-60
Eight-engined jet aircraft
High-wing aircraft
Aircraft first flown in 1952
YB-60